The US Bank Building is a high-rise building in the western United States, located in Boise, Idaho. Completed  in 1978 and renovated in 2004, it rises  spanning 19 floors. The tallest building in the state for over thirty years, it was surpassed by the  Eighth & Main Building, which opened in 2014.

History
Originally "Idaho First Plaza," the building was the headquarters of the Idaho First National Bank, which was founded in 1867. Built by EmKay Development and Realty Company, a wholly owned subsidiary of Boise-based Morrison-Knudsen, it opened in September 1978.

Following acquisitions in neighboring states, IFNB changed its name to West One Bank in 1989, and was acquired by U.S. Bank of Portland in 1995.

In 2000, the building was purchased by the property development firm Unico.

The building does not have a 13th floor.

See also
 List of tallest buildings by U.S. state
 List of tallest buildings in Boise

References

External links

Unico page – U.S. Bank Plaza (PDF format)

U.S. Bank buildings
Skyscraper office buildings in Boise, Idaho
Office buildings completed in 1978
1978 establishments in Idaho